The Roman Catholic Diocese of Itabira–Fabriciano is a diocese located in the cities of Itabira and Coronel Fabriciano in the Ecclesiastical province of Mariana in Brazil.

History
 June 14, 1965: Established as Diocese of Itabira from the Metropolitan Archdiocese of Diamantina and Metropolitan Archdiocese of Mariana
 June 1, 1979: Renamed as Diocese of Itabira – Fabriciano

Bishops

Ordinaries, in reverse chronological order
 Bishops of Itabira–Fabriciano (Roman rite), below
 Bishop Marco Aurélio Gubiotti (2013.02.21 - present)
 Bishop Odilon Guimarães Moreira (2003.01.22 – 2013.02.21)
 Bishop Lélis Lara, C.Ss.R. (1996.05.15 – 2003.01.22)
 Bishop Mário Teixeira Gurgel, S.D.S. (1979.06.01 – 1996.05.15)
 Bishops of Itabira (Roman Rite), below
 Bishop Mário Teixeira Gurgel, S.D.S. (1971.04.26 – 1979.06.01)
 Bishop Marcos Antônio Noronha (1965.07.07 – 1970.11.07)

Coadjutor bishop
Lélis Lara, C.SS.R. (1995-1996)

Auxiliary bishop
Lélis Lara, C.SS.R. (1976-1995), appointed Coadjutor here

References

 GCatholic.org
 Catholic Hierarchy

Roman Catholic dioceses in Brazil
Christian organizations established in 1965
Itabira-Fabriciano, Roman Catholic Diocese of
Roman Catholic dioceses and prelatures established in the 20th century